Edward Mitford Hutton Riddell  (31 October 1845 – 22 October 1898) was an English first-class cricketer.

The son of J. H. Riddell, he was born in October 1845 at Carlton-on-Trent, Nottinghamshire. He was educated at Uppingham School, after which he became a banker and served as a justice of the peace. Riddell played first-class cricket on four occasions, making his first-class debut for the Marylebone Cricket Club (MCC) against Nottinghamshire at Lord's in 1870. He played a first-class match for the Gentlemen of the North in the same year against the Gentlemen of the South at Beeston. He made two further first-class appearances in 1871, playing one match each for the MCC and the Gentlemen of the North. Across his four first-class matches, Riddell scored 89 runs with a high score of 36, in addition to taking two wickets with his right-arm medium-fast bowling. He died at Lincoln in October 1898.

References

External links

1845 births
1898 deaths
People from Newark and Sherwood (district)
Cricketers from Nottinghamshire
People educated at Uppingham School
English bankers
English justices of the peace
English cricketers
Marylebone Cricket Club cricketers
Gentlemen of the North cricketers
19th-century English businesspeople